Emma Masterson, also known as Worarat Suwannarat (born 22 January 1977) is a Thai actress, model, and television presenter who was crowned Miss Asia Pacific 1997.  She hosted talk show Sawasdee Bangkok and was an ambassador for the Tourism Authority of Thailand.

Early life and education
Masterson was born in Bangkok but raised in Ireland to an Irish father and a Thai Irish mother. Despite being raised in Ireland, she is fluent in both English and Thai. She received her Bachelor's degree in Faculty of Business from Assumption University, with Principal’s Honor Roll, a Master's degree in  Faculty of Liberal Arts, education of European Studies from Chulalongkorn University, with Principal’s Honor Roll, another Master's degree in Faculty of Philosophy, University of Cambridge, with Principal’s Honor Roll and a Ph.D. of Political Science from University of Freiburg, Germany.

Pageantry
She was the first runner-up in the 1997 Miss Thailand pageant with the special award "Miss Popular Vote" from the audiences. She represented Thailand at the 1997 Miss Asia Pacific pageant held in Davao City, Philippines and won the competition, becoming the third Thai woman to capture the title. She also won the special award title Miss Best Smile.

Actress
She starred in several Thai television soap opera, mostly as leading actress. Her most famous work is Angkor, an action series where she and Pete Thongchua lead the role, produced and directed by Chalong Pakdeevijit. The series achieved Thailand TV rating of 30, highest achieved by the director of the series. The three reunited in another action series Thong 5.

References

External links
 Emma Suwannarat/Model

1977 births
Living people
Worarat Suwannarat
Worarat Suwannarat
Alumni of the University of Cambridge
University of Freiburg alumni
Worarat Suwannarat
Worarat Suwannarat
Worarat Suwannarat
Worarat Suwannarat
Worarat Suwannarat
Miss Asia Pacific International winners